, commonly called as , is regarded as one of the world's leading spring manufacturers. NHK also makes seats for automobiles, suspension systems for disk read-and-write heads used in hard-disk drives, industrial machinery & equipment and security solutions.

The company shares its initials, NHK, with the Japan Broadcasting Corporation, although it registered its trademark before the establishment of the latter organization.

The company is listed on the first section of the Tokyo Stock Exchange and has 51 subsidiaries, 23 in Japan and 28 overseas.

References

External links

Auto parts suppliers of Japan
Manufacturing companies based in Yokohama
Manufacturing companies established in 1939
Companies listed on the Tokyo Stock Exchange
Sojitz
Japanese companies established in 1939